Gunnar Andersson (born 1890, Tjällmo, d. 1946) was a Swedish trade union organizer. He belonged to the Metalworkers' Union. In 1946 Andersson was elected as chairman of the Swedish Trade Union Confederation, but died prior to the initiation of his term in office.

References

Swedish trade union leaders
1890 births
1946 deaths